Milton Tucker (17 May 1921 – 1986) was a Barbadian sports shooter. He competed at the 1968 Summer Olympics and the 1972 Summer Olympics.

References

1921 births
1986 deaths
Barbadian male sport shooters
Olympic shooters of Barbados
Shooters at the 1968 Summer Olympics
Shooters at the 1972 Summer Olympics
Commonwealth Games competitors for Barbados
Shooters at the 1966 British Empire and Commonwealth Games
Shooters at the 1974 British Commonwealth Games
Shooters at the 1978 Commonwealth Games